Streptomyces lonarensis is an alkaliphilic bacterium species from the genus of Streptomyces which has been isolated from soil from the Lonar Lake in India.

See also 
 List of Streptomyces species

References

External links
Type strain of Streptomyces lonarensis at BacDive -  the Bacterial Diversity Metadatabase

 

lonarensis
Bacteria described in 2016
Alkaliphiles